Jody Hill (born October 15, 1976) is an American director, producer, screenwriter, and actor. In 2006, he directed, co-wrote, co-produced and co-starred in his first film The Foot Fist Way, which he based on his experience as a Taekwondo black belt and instructor. His follow-up film, Observe and Report, stars Seth Rogen and was released on April 10, 2009. Hill is also co-creator, director and executive producer of the HBO series Eastbound & Down, Vice Principals, and The Righteous Gemstones.

Career
Hill's first film, The Foot Fist Way, was seen by Will Ferrell and Adam McKay who bought the distributing rights to the film. Subsequently, Hill was invited to the set of Knocked Up where he met future collaborator, Seth Rogen. Hill was asked to do a cameo appearance with writing partner Ben Best in Rogen's next film, Superbad, as Tut Long John Silver. Hill later cast Rogen as the leading man in his film, Observe and Report, which opened at number 4 at the box office. The role of Ronnie was written specifically for Rogen.

In 2009, Hill directed The Avett Brothers music video "Slight Figure of Speech," which featured Wolfe and Andy Daly. The following year he directed the parody music video Swagger Wagon as part of ad agency Saatchi & Saatchi's campaign for the Sienna SE minivan from Toyota.

In 2009, Hill co-created the HBO show Eastbound & Down, on which he acted as Executive Producer and directed a total of 16 episodes. The show finished its fourth and last season in 2013.

Hill's next film, L.A.P.I., was announced as an action comedy about a hardboiled private investigator, played by friend and frequent collaborator Danny McBride. It is the first film Hill would direct but not write. It is also the first film produced by Hill's, McBride's and David Gordon Green's production company, Rough House Pictures. In 2014, Hill and McBride created and began preparing the comedy series Vice Principals for HBO.

Since 2019, Hill has directed 8 episodes of The Righteous Gemstones. He also acts in the series as Levi.

Personal life
Hill is a graduate of the University of North Carolina School of the Arts. As of 2009, Hill was in a long term relationship, from at least 2008, with actress Collette Wolfe, who appeared in his movies Observe and Report and The Foot Fist Way. The couple eventually married in 2012 in Cabo San Lucas, but have since divorced.

Filmography

Film

Television

References

External links
 
Vice on Jody Hill, Danny McBride and Eastbound and Down

1976 births
Living people
American film producers
American male screenwriters
American male taekwondo practitioners
American television writers
Comedy film directors
Film directors from North Carolina
American male television writers
People from Concord, North Carolina
Screenwriters from North Carolina
Showrunners
University of North Carolina School of the Arts alumni